Tommaso Costantini (born 23 June 1996) is an Italian football player who plays for Serie D club AC Sammaurese.

Club career
He made his Serie C debut for Juve Stabia on 26 August 2017 in a game against Fidelis Andria.

References

External links
 

1996 births
People from Pesaro
Sportspeople from the Province of Pesaro and Urbino
Living people
Italian footballers
Association football forwards
Vis Pesaro dal 1898 players
S.P.A.L. players
S.S. Juve Stabia players
Ravenna F.C. players
U.S. Massese 1919 players
Serie C players
Serie D players
A.S.D. Mezzolara players
Footballers from Marche